Alexandru Țigănașu (born 12 June 1990) is a Romanian professional footballer who plays as a left-back or a midfielder for Liga I club Botoșani.

Honours
Studențesc Iași
Liga II: 2013–14

References

External links
 
 

1990 births
Living people
People from Săveni
Romanian footballers
Romania under-21 international footballers
Association football midfielders
Liga I players
Liga II players
Liga III players
FC Botoșani players
FC Astra Giurgiu players
FC Politehnica Iași (2010) players
ACS Poli Timișoara players
FC Petrolul Ploiești players